Woisika, also known as Kamang, is a Papuan language of Alor Island of Indonesia. The three main dialects are Western Kamang, Lowland Kamang, and Upland Kamang. Dialects also include Lembur, Sibo, Kamang, Tiayai, Watang, Kamana-Kamang. They may constitute more than one language. Kamang is an endangered language, since children usually only have passive competence of the language, and instead are shifting to Malay.

Speakers may prefer the term Kamang to refer to the speech community as a whole; Woisika is a village name.

Phonology

Consonants

/h/ and /ʔ/ are marginal. /r/ is rare in initial and final position. Word-final /s/ is only in loan words.

The consonant /ŋ/ is not found word-initially, and /f/ is not found word-finally.

Vowels

Grammar

Serial verb constructions

Kamang has serial verb constructions.

Valence

Examples with avalent, monovalent, bivalent, and trivalent verbs are shown below.

Avalent

Monovalent

Bivalent

Trivalent

Riddles
Woisika riddles relate to animals, the human body, human artifacts, natural phenomena, crops and other foods, among others.

References

Alor–Pantar languages
Languages of Indonesia